William Rae Tomlinson (24 January 1902 – 31 December 1979) was a Liberal party member of the House of Commons of Canada. He was born in Seneca Township, Ontario and became a barrister by career.

He attended high school at Caledonia, then proceeded to law studies at Osgoode Hall Law School. He was appointed King's Counsel in 1937.

He was first elected to Parliament at the Bruce riding in the 1935 general election and re-elected there in 1940. After completing his term in the 19th Canadian Parliament, Tomlinson did not seek re-election in 1945.

References

External links
 

1902 births
1979 deaths
Liberal Party of Canada MPs
Members of the House of Commons of Canada from Ontario
People from Bruce County
Canadian King's Counsel
Osgoode Hall Law School alumni